Giovanni Battista Jona, originally Judah Jonah of Safed, (d.1678), was a Hebrew writer at the Vatican. Along with the censor Domenico Gerosolimitano he was one of two converted Jewish Scriptens at the Vatican who each produced translations of the New Testament into Hebrew.

References

1678 deaths
16th-century Italian Jews
Translators of the New Testament into Hebrew
Year of birth unknown
Jewish translators of the Bible